The Copa del Rey 2009-10 was the 74th edition of the Spanish basketball Cup. It was managed by the ACB and was disputed in Bilbao, Basque Country in the Bizkaia Arena between days 18 and 21 of February.

Brackett

Quarterfinals

Semifinals

Final

MVP of the Tournament: Fran Vázquez

Television broadcasting
TVE2, FORTA and Teledeporte.

External links
2009/2010 Copa del Rey Official Website

Copa del Rey de Baloncesto
2009–10 in Spanish basketball cups